A wide variety of steam locomotives have been used on Ireland's railways. This page lists most if not all those that have been used in the Republic of Ireland and Northern Ireland. Irish railways generally followed British practice in locomotive design.

The list that follows is roughly geographic (north to south) order.

Northern Ireland
The Ulster Transport Authority, which controlled the railways in Northern Ireland between 1948 and 1966, replaced steam haulage on passenger trains with diesel multiple units, but had only two diesel shunting locomotives, which meant a continued role for steam on freight work. Twenty-three locomotives passed to Northern Ireland Railways in 1967, but most were not used again and all had been withdrawn by 1971.

Belfast and County Down Railway
The Belfast and County Down Railway was founded in 1848. It absorbed the Belfast, Hollywood and Bangor Railway in 1884 and continued operating until it was nationalised in its centenary year into the Ulster Transport Authority as a result of the Ireland Act 1949.

Belfast and Northern Counties Railway (1848–1903) & Northern Counties Committee (1903–1949)

The Belfast and Northern Counties Railway (BNCR), was a railway that served the north-east of Ireland. It had its origins in the Belfast and Ballymena Railway that opened to traffic on 11 April 1848. The Northern Counties Committee came into existence on 1 July 1903 as the result of the Midland Railway taking over the BNCR. At the 1923 Grouping the Committee became part of the London Midland & Scottish Railway (LMS); with the nationalisation of the railways in Britain in 1948 the line passed to the British Transport Commission and in the following year, 1949, it was sold to the Ulster Transport Authority (UTA) as a result of the Ireland Act 1949.

Belfast and Ballymena Railway (1848–1860) and other constituents
The early locomotives of the constituent companies were to assorted designs from a number of manufacturers. The first locomotives for the Belfast and Ballymena Railway were purchased from Bury, Curtis and Kennedy. These were four 2-2-2 singles and one 0-4-2 goods engine.  Later, four more 2-2-2s were ordered but this time from Sharp Brothers. Fairbairn 2-2-2s were to be found on the Ballymena Ballymena, Ballymoney, Coleraine and Portrush Junction Railway but this company also favoured Sharp locomotives which were double framed 2-4-0s.

Belfast and Northern Counties Railway (1860–1903)
The BNCR introduced class letters for its locomotive stock in 1897. The MR (NCC) and later the LMS (NCC) continued to use the system adding new classes as required.

Northern Counties Committee (1903–1949)

Cross-Border Lines
Following the division of Ireland in 1921 into two administrations, a number of railways now found themselves operating on both sides of the newly created boundary between Northern Ireland and the Irish Free State (later Republic of Ireland).

West Donegal Railway 
The  West Donegal Railway became the Donegal Railway in 1892; and the County Donegal Railways Joint Committee after being jointly acquired in 1906 by the Great Northern Railway and the Midland Railway's Northern Counties Committee.

Dundalk, Newry and Greenore Railway

Great Northern Railway
The Great Northern Railway (GNR) was formed in 1876 acquiring a variety of locomotives.   Nos 1 to 23 were from Dublin and Drogheda Railway; Nos. 24 to 41 from the Dublin and Belfast Junction Railway; Nos. 43 to circa 78 from the Irish North Western Railway and Londonderry and Enniskillen Railway; Numbers in the eighties from the Newry and Armagh Railway and nos. 100 to 141 from the Ulster Railway.  Later acquisitions in the 1880s from the Newry, Warrenpoint, and Rostrevor and the Belfast Central Railway were numbered in the Nineties.  The GNR straddled the border between the Republic and Northern Ireland (after 1921), and so was not incorporated in either the CIÉ or Ulster Transport Authority. However, mounting losses saw the network purchased jointly by the Irish and British governments on 1 September 1953. It was run as a joint board, independent of the CIÉ and UTA, until 30 September 1958 when it was dissolved and the remaining stock split equally between the two railways.

? (1877–1881)

James Crawford Park (1881–1895)

Charles Clifford (1895–1912)

G. T. Glover (1912–1933)

G. B. Howden (1933–1939)

H. R. McIntosh (1939–1953)

Londonderry and Lough Swilly Railway
Broad gauge locomotives (1862–1882)

Narrow gauge locomotives (1882–1954)

Sligo, Leitrim and Northern Counties Railway
The Sligo, Leitrim and Northern Counties Railway was a small cross-border railway that closed in 1957. Its locomotive fleet never carried numbers, only names.

Irish Free State and Republic of Ireland
The railways wholly in the Irish Free State were merged into one private company — Great Southern Railways — in 1925.  The GSR renumbered all the broad gauge locomotives into one series with the former Great Southern and Western Railway locomotives retaining their old number. The GSR had two parallel classification systems – a numerical system which was the lowest number of a locomotive in that class, and an alpha-numerical which used a letter to indicate the wheel arrangement, and a number, with the lowest number given to the most powerful class with that wheel arrangement. The latter system was only used by Inchicore Works for accounting purposes, while the former was used by locomotive crews and the drawing office at Inchicore Works.

Note that narrow gauge locomotive classes included the letter N after the prefix letter, letter C was also used for Bo-Bo diesels, and that letters B, C, D, F, J, and K were used for the same wheel arrangements by the London and North Eastern Railway, while E and G changed places.

In 1945, the GSR became part of Córas Iompair Éireann (CIÉ), which amalgamated the railway, road transport and canal functions of the State. CIÉ was nationalised in 1950 and settled on a policy of replacing steam with diesel locomotives, a process that was completed in 1962.

Midland Great Western Railway (1847–1924)
M. Atock (1872–1901)
 MGWR Class D – GSR Class 530 or Class D16
 MGWR Class E – GSR Class 551 or Class J26
 MGWR Class H – GSR Class 619 or Class J6
 MGWR Class K – GSR Class 650 or Class G2
 MGWR Classes L and Lm – GSR Classes 573 and 594, Classes J18 and J19
 MGWR Class Ln – GSR Class 563 or Class J16
 MGWR Class P – GSR Class 614 or Class J10
 MGWR Class W – GSR Class 234 or Class J17

E. Cusack (1901–1915)
 MGWR Classes A, As and A1 – GSR class 545 or Class D5
 MGWR Class B – GSR Class 646 or Class J2
 MGWR Classes C and Cs – GSR Class 536 or Class D7
 MGWR Classes C and C1 – GSR Class 540 or Class D6

W. H. Morton (1915–1924)
 MGWR Classes F, Fa, and Fb – GSR Class 623 or Class J5

Great Southern and Western Railway (1845–1924)
Alexander McDonnell (1864–1883)
 GS&WR Class 2 – GSR Class 2 or Class D19
 GS&WR Class 21 – GSR Class 21 or Class G4
 GS&WR Class 47 – GSR Class 47 or Class E3
 GS&WR Class 90 – GSR Class 90 or Class J30
 GS&WR Class 91 – GSR Class 91 or Class J29
 GS&WR Class 92 – GSR Class 92 or Class H2
 GS&WR Class 101 – GSR Class 101 or Class J15
 GS&WR Class 203 – GSR Class 203 or Class H1
 GS&WR Class 204 – GSR Class 204 or Class J12
 GS&WR Class Sprite – GSR Class Sprite or Classes L4 and L5

John Aspinall (1883–1886)
 GS&WR Class 52 – GSR Class 52 or Class D17
 GS&WR Class 60 – GSR Class 60 or Class D14

Henry Ivatt (1886–1896)
 GS&WR Class 33 – GSR Class 33 or Class F6
 GS&WR Class 37 – GSR Class 37 or Class C7
 GS&WR Class 201 – GSR Class 201 or Class J11
 GS&WR Jumbo – GSR Class Jumbo or Class J13

Robert Coey (1896–1911)
 GS&WR Class 27 – GSR Class 27 or Class C4
 GS&WR Class 211 – GSR Class 211 or Class J3
 GS&WR Class 213 – GSR Class 213 or Class I1
 GS&WR Class 301 – GSR Class 301 or Class D11
 GS&WR Class 305 – GSR Class 305 or Class D12
 GS&WR Class 309 – GSR Class 309 or Classes D3 and D10
 GS&WR Class 321 – GSR Class 321 or Classes D2, D3, and D4
 GS&WR Class 333 – GSR Class 333 or Classes D2, D3, D4, and D4a
 GS&WR Class 341 – GSR Class 341 or Class D1
 GS&WR Class 351 – GSR Class 351 or Class J9
 GS&WR Class 355 – GSR Class 355 or Class K3
 GS&WR Class 362 – GSR Class 362 or Class B3 – "Long Toms"
 GS&WR Class 368 – GSR Class 368 or Class K4

Richard Maunsell (1911–1913)
 GS&WR Class 257 – GSR Class 257 or Class J4
 GS&WR Sambo – GSR Class Sambo or Class L2

E. A. Watson (1913–1922)
 GS&WR Class 900 – GSR Class 900 or Class A1
 GS&WR 400 Class – GSR Class 400 or Classes B2 & B2a

J. R. Bazin (1922–1924)
 GS&WR Class 500 – GSR Class 500 or Class B1

Waterford & Limerick Railway
The Waterford and Limerick Railway changed its name to Waterford, Limerick and Western Railway in 1896. It was acquired by the Great Southern and Western Railway in 1900; by which time all but one of its locomotive fleet had been designed by Robinson.

J. G. Robinson (1888–1900)

Dublin and Kingstown Railway

Dublin and South Eastern Railway (1853–1924)
The Dublin and South Eastern Railway started out in 1846 as the Waterford, Wexford, Wicklow and Dublin Railway Company. In 1853 it was renamed the Dublin and Wicklow Railway Company, and in 1860 it was renamed the Dublin, Wicklow and Wexford Railway Company and on 31 December 1906 it was renamed again as the Dublin and South Eastern.

 Frederick Pemberton (1854–1856)
 S. W. Haughton (1856-1864)
 William Meikle (1856-1864)

J. Wakefield (1865–1882)

W. Wakefield (1882–1894)

T. Grierson (1894–1897)

R. Cronin (1897–1917)

G. H. Wild (1917–1924)

Cork, Bandon and South Coast Railway (to 1924)

Minor broad gauge railways

Waterford & Tramore Railway
 WTR Nos. 1 and 2 – GSR Class 483 or N1
 WTR No. 3 – GSR Class 485 or L3
 WTR No. 4 – GSR Class 486 or L1

Cork & Macroom Direct Railway
 CMDR Nos. 2–4 – GSR Class 487 or G5
 CMDR No. 5 – GSR Class 490 or I2
 CMDR No. 6 – GSR Class 491 or F5

Timoleague & Courtmacsherry Light Railway
 TCLR Argadeen – GSR Class K5
 TCLR St. Molaga – GSR Class L6

Narrow gauge railways

Cavan & Leitrim Railway (to 1924)
 CLR 1 to 8 — GSR Class 1L or Class DN2
 CLR 9 – GSR Class 9L or HN1

Cork, Blackrock & Passage Railway (to 1924)
 CBPR 1 to 3 – Broad gauge 2-2-2WT
 CBPR 4 to 7 – GSR Class 4P or Class FN1, later Class 10L

Cork & Muskerry Light Railway (to 1924)
 CMLR 1 to 3 – GSR Class 1K or Class DN6
 CMLR 4 and 5 – GSR Class 5K or Class EN1, later Class 6S
 CMLR 7 – GSR Class 7K or DN3
 CMLR 8 – GSR Class 8K or DN7

Schull & Skibbereen Railway (to 1924)
 SSLR 1 to 3 – GSR Class 2S or Class MN1
 SSLR 4 – GSR Class 4S or Class DN5
 SSLR 1 and 3 – GSR Class 1S or Class DN4

Tralee & Dingle Light Railway (to 1924)
 TDLR 1 to 3, 6, and 8 – GSR Class 1T or Class KN2
 TDLR 5 – GSR Class 5T or Class PN2 Currently preserved
 TDLR 7 and 8 – GSR Class 4T or Class KN1

West Clare Railway (to 1924)
 WCR 5 to 7 – GSR Class 5C or Class IN1. No 5 is preserved and operational at the West Clare preserved Railway
 WCR 2, 4, 8, and 9 – GSR Class 2C or Class PN1
 WCR 10 – GSR Class 10C or Class BN1
 WCR 11 – GSR Class 11C or Class BN2
 WCR 1 – GSR Class 1C or Class BN3
 WCR 3 and 7 – GSR Class 3C or Class BN4

Bord Na Mona
 BNM 1/3 WN 2263-2265 Originally numbered 1-3 Renumbered to LM43/45. Extensively upgraded and Modified E Class locomotives from WW1. All 3 survive in Preservation. 1 is now No 7 on the Talyllyn. No 2 resides operational on the Stradbally Woodland Railway. No 3 "Shane" now preserved and awaiting overhaul on the Giants Causeway Line.

Great Southern Railways (1925–1944) and Córas Iompair Éireann (from 1945)

The GSR introduced just under sixty steam locomotives between 1925 and 1944, whilst CIÉ introduced one, the experimental Bulleid turf burner. CIÉ did however acquire 83 steam locomotives, which was precisely half of the Great Northern Railway stock, when that company was split between CIÉ and the Ulster Transport Authority after 30 September 1958.

J. R. Bazin (1925–1929)
 GSR Class 372 – also Class K1: Numbers 372–391 (R.E.L. Maunsell, imported in 1924)
 GSR Class 280 – also Class M1 (previous Class M1 became Class M2): numbers 280–281
 GSR Class 700 – also Class J15a: Numbers 700–704
 GSR Class 850 – also Class P1: Number 850

W. H. Morton (1929–1932)
 GSR Class 393 – also Class K1a: Numbers 393–398 (R.E.L. Maunsell, imported in 1924)
 GSR Class 495 – also Class M3: Number 495

A. W. Harty (1932–1937)
 GSR Class 670 – also Class I3: Numbers 670–674
 GSR Class 710 – also Class J15b: Numbers 710–719

Edgar Craven Bredin (1937–1942)
 GSR Class 800 – also Class B1a: Numbers 800–802

M. J. Ginnetty (1942–1944)

C. F. Tyndall (1944–1951)

O. V. S Bulleid (1951–1958)
 CIÉ No.CC1 Turf-burning locomotive

Preserved locomotives

In addition to the 19 preserved Irish broad gauge locomotives, a NCC Class W new build project is currently in the works.

See also 
Diesel locomotives of Ireland
Multiple units of Ireland
Coaching stock of Ireland
History of rail transport in Ireland
Rail freight stock of Ireland

Notes

References

Sources

External links 

Eiretrains - Irish Steam Locomotives
Irish Railway Technology and Information -reporting on all aspects of Irish railways
Guinness locomotives